Urška Rabič (born 20 March 1985 in Mojstrana) is a Slovenian former alpine skier who competed in the 2006 Winter Olympics.

External links
 sports-reference.com

1985 births
Living people
Slovenian female alpine skiers
Olympic alpine skiers of Slovenia
Alpine skiers at the 2006 Winter Olympics
Universiade medalists in alpine skiing
People from the Municipality of Kranjska Gora
Universiade bronze medalists for Slovenia
Competitors at the 2007 Winter Universiade